This is a list of some vector calculus formulae for working with common curvilinear coordinate systems.

Notes 

 This article uses the standard notation ISO 80000-2, which supersedes ISO 31-11, for spherical coordinates (other sources may reverse the definitions of θ and φ):
 The  polar angle is denoted by : it is the angle between the z-axis and the radial vector connecting the origin to the point in question.
 The azimuthal angle  is denoted by : it is the angle between the x-axis and the projection of the radial vector onto the xy-plane.
 The function  can be used instead of the mathematical function  owing to its domain and image.

Coordinate conversions 

CAUTION: the operation  must be interpreted as the two-argument inverse tangent, atan2.

Unit vector conversions

Del formula 

Calculation rules 

 
 
 
  (Lagrange's formula for del)

Cartesian derivation 

Cylindrical derivation

Spherical derivation

Unit vector conversion formula 
The unit vector of a coordinate parameter u is defined in such a way that a small positive change in u causes the position vector  to change in  direction.

Therefore, 
 
where  is the arc length parameter.

Now, we isolate the th component. For , let .

See also 
 Del
 Orthogonal coordinates
 Curvilinear coordinates
 Vector fields in cylindrical and spherical coordinates

References

External links 
 Maxima Computer Algebra system scripts to generate some of these operators in cylindrical and spherical coordinates.

Vector calculus
Coordinate systems